The 48th Pennsylvania House of Representatives District is located in southwest Pennsylvania and has been represented by Tim O'Neal since 2018.

District profile 
The 48th  District is located in Washington County and includes the following areas:

Amwell Township
Carroll Township (part)
District 03
District 04
District 05
Donora
East Finley Township
 East Washington
Fallowfield Township
 Green Hills
Morris Township
 North Franklin Township
 North Strabane Township (part)
District 01
District 02
District 03
District 04
District 05
Nottingham Township
Somerset Township
South Franklin Township
 South Strabane Township
 Washington
West Finley Township

Representatives

Recent election results

External links 
 District map from the United States Census Bureau
 Pennsylvania House Legislative District Maps from the Pennsylvania Redistricting Commission.
 Population Data for District 48 from the Pennsylvania Redistricting Commission.

References

Government of Washington County, Pennsylvania
48